Mycobacterium simiae is a species of Mycobacterium.As per Runyon's classification it is classified as a photochromogen as it produces pigments only when exposed to light.

References

External links	
Type strain of Mycobacterium simiae at BacDive -  the Bacterial Diversity Metadatabase

simiae